Ritva Tuulikki "Kike" Elomaa (née Sainio; born 16 July 1955, in Lokalahti) is a Finnish professional female bodybuilding champion, pop singer, and member of the Finnish Parliament.

Early life and education
Kike Elomaa was born in Lokalahti, Finland in 1955. She matriculated from Mynämäki gymnasium in 1975 and graduated from Helsinki Nursing School as radiographer in 1980.

Bodybuilding career

Amateur

Professional
In 1981, Kike defeated Rachel McLish at the IFBB Ms. Olympia. Following her wildly successful contest campaign in 1981, she competed only three more times, placing third at the 1982 IFBB Ms. Olympia and second at the 1983 IFBB Pro Worlds.

Retirement
Kike ended her career on stage after a fifth-place finish at the 1983 IFBB Ms. Olympia.

Legacy
Currently Kike is the most successful Finnish bodybuilder of all time. She was the only non-American to win the Ms. Olympia title until 2000. She was inducted into the IFBB Hall of Fame in 2001.  She has also been awarded the IFBB's President's Gold Medal for her work in supporting the sport of bodybuilding.  A fitness contest, the Kike Elomaa Fitness Championship, is held annually in Finland.

Contest history
 1981 Finnish Championships – 1st
 1981 European Championships – 1st
 1981 World Games – 1st (Middleweight Women)
 1981 IFBB Ms. Olympia – 1st
 1982 IFBB Ms. Olympia – 3rd
 1983 Pro World Championship – 2nd
 1983 IFBB Ms. Olympia – 5th

Parliament of Finland

2011 election
On 17 April 2011, Kike was elected into Finnish parliament for the 2011–2015 term, representing the electoral district of Finland Proper as a member of the Finns Party.

On 13 June 2017, Elomaa and 19 others left the Finns Party parliamentary group to found the New Alternative parliamentary group. However, on 22 June, she left the group and re-joined the Finns Party.

References

| colspan = 3 align = center | Ms. Olympia
|-
| width = 30% align = center | Preceded by:Rachel McLish
| width = 40% align = center | First (1981)
| width = 30% align = center | Succeeded by:Rachel McLish

1955 births
Living people
People from Uusikaupunki
Finnish Lutherans
Finns Party politicians
Members of the Parliament of Finland (2011–15)
Members of the Parliament of Finland (2015–19)
Members of the Parliament of Finland (2019–23)
21st-century Finnish women politicians
Finnish female bodybuilders
20th-century Finnish women singers
Finnish pop singers
Professional bodybuilders
World Games gold medalists
Competitors at the 1981 World Games